The Primera C Metropolitana is one of the two professional leagues that form the fourth level of the Argentine football league system. Primera C Metropolitana is made up of 20 clubs mainly from the city of Buenos Aires and its metropolitan area (Greater Buenos Aires).

The other league at level four is the Torneo Federal B, where teams from regional leagues take part.

Format 
Primera C is currently organised into two league tournaments, the Apertura (opening) and the Clausura (closing). Each team plays every other team once in the Apertura, and then once again at the reverse venue in the Clausura.

The winners of the two league titles are recognised as champions. However, the overall championship is decided with an end of season playoff. The overall champion is promoted to Primera B Metropolitana. The teams finishing 2nd to 8th enter a playoff series to determine which team will play in a promotion/relegation playoff against the 2nd lowest finishing team from Primera B Metropolitana.

The team that finishes with the worst aggregate points total is automatically relegated to Primera D. The team with the 2nd worst aggregate points total plays a promotion/relegation playoff with the winner of the Primera D playoff series. And the winner then competes in Primera C Metropolitana the following season.

History 
Originally named "Tercera División" (second level), the first championship was held in 1900, being won by Alumni (still under the "English High School" name). With the creation of División Intermedia in 1911, the division became the fourth level behind Segunda División. It lasted until 1932 when the Intermedia was suppressed and Tercera División became the 3rd. division/level again since the 1933 season.

In 1944 its name changed to "Primera Amateur", which lasted to 1962, when the tournament was renamed "Primera C", Since the new restructuring of the league system in 1985, the division has become the fourth category of Argentine football (lower than Primera División, Primera B Nacional and Primera B Metropolitana).

Division levels 
Since its inception in 1899 as "Tercera División", the Primera C has changed levels (between 3 and 4) and names several times. The table below shows them in details:

Current teams (2022 season)

List of champions
Sources:

Titles by club

Notes

References

External links
 

 
1900 establishments in Argentina
4
2
Argentina
Professional sports leagues in Argentina
Sports leagues established in 1900